Petar Dimitrov Gabrovski (9 July 1898 – 1 February 1945) was a Bulgarian politician who briefly served as Prime Minister during the Second World War. Gabrovski was a lawyer by profession. He was also a member of the Grand Masonic Lodge of Bulgaria.

Early years
Gabrovski began his political career as a Nazi, forming his own movement the Ratniks of the Advancement of the Bulgarian National Spirit (Ratnitsi Napreduka na Bulgarshtinata) - more commonly known as Ratnik or the Ratnitsi. The group was virulently Anti-Semitic and was said to have links to Nazi Germany, although it failed to achieve anything approaching a mass following. In 1939 a law banning members of the group from government office was passed although it was not observed for long.

Minister of the Interior
Gabrovski's political career took off in October 1939 when he was brought into the cabinet of Georgi Kyoseivanov as minister responsible for the railways, with his appointment to the cabinet seeing him resigning from the Ratnitsi. In the cabinet established by Bogdan Filov in 1940 he was promoted to the post of Minister of the Interior. The appointment had been made by King Boris III as an attempt to demonstrate to the Nazis that Bulgaria was largely favourable towards them. In this role Gabrovski was quick to enact laws limiting the role of Jews in Bulgarian life and expelled several hundred recently arrived Jews, who had hoped to gain entry into Mandatory Palestine from Bulgaria, forcing them to go to Turkey instead. His bill, the Law for the Defence of the Nation, was modelled on similar legislation in Nazi Germany.

Gabrovski also sent Alexander Belev, a fellow lawyer and Ratnik whom he appointed to a post in the ministry, to Nazi Germany to make a study of their racial laws. He subsequently became associated with the deportation of Jews to extermination camps and most notoriously signed a written agreement to approve the deportation of 20,000 Jews from Macedonia and Thrace on 22 February 1943. As none of these Jews had been granted Bulgarian citizenship following the incorporation of those territories Gabrovski told German ambassador Adolf Beckerle that their deportation would be a much simpler matter than any similar attempts against those Jews with citizenship given the relative lack of anti-Semitic sentiment in Bulgaria. Ultimately however the plan, as developed by Gabrovski and Belev (who worked under Gabrovski as Commissar of Jewish Questions), was vetoed by the King.

Fall from power
Following the death of Boris III Gabrovski served as acting Prime Minister between 9 September and 14 September 1943, whilst the country's main political leaders served as regents for Simeon II. He was overlooked for the job full-time however and his position waned from there on as he was seen as too strong a rival for power.

Execution
Following the establishment of Fatherland Front government Gabrovski was arrested and brought before the People's Court where a sentence of death was passed. He was executed on 1 February 1945. In a move widely condemned by Jewish groups Gabrovski was rehabilitated by the Bulgarian Supreme Court in 1996, with the stated reason being that his initial trial contained several irregularities.

References

 

1898 births
1945 deaths
Bulgarian nationalists
People from Razgrad
Bulgarian collaborators with Nazi Germany
Prime Ministers of Bulgaria
Ratniks
20th-century Bulgarian lawyers
Executed prime ministers
Executed Bulgarian people
Holocaust perpetrators in Greece
People executed by the People's Republic of Bulgaria
Holocaust perpetrators in Bulgaria
Holocaust perpetrators in Yugoslavia
People executed by Bulgaria by firing squad
Bulgarian Freemasons
People's Court (Bulgaria)